General William Robertson of Lude (died 1820) was an officer in the British Army who served in the army during the American War of Independence, the French Revolutionary, and the Napoleonic wars.

Biography
Robertson was the son of James Robertson of Lude (1736–1802) and Aldie, daughter of Robert Nairne and Jean Mecer. He entered the British Army at 15. He fought in the American War of Independence, and in Holland, and also at the taking of St. Lucia, and several of the islands of the West Indies.

In 1794 he raised a regiment of infantry called the Perthshire Fencibles. In  1800 he accompanied the Ferrol Expedition to the coast of Spain under Sir James Murray Pulteney. In 1804 a corps of volunteers. In 1805 he was appointed to the army staff in Scotland, and served in that capacity, as a commanding officer in the Channel Islands and in various districts in England, until the end of 1813, when he was promoted to the rank of lieutenant-general. He died in 1820.

Family
In 1802 Robertson married  Margaret, eldest daughter of George Haldane, 18th of Gleneagles, Perthshire, and Margaret, eldest daughter of James Drummond, Viscount of Strathallan. They had 2 sons, James Alexander (who served in the 82nd Foot) and a younger son who died as an infant in 1814. Robertson married secondly Menzies of Culdares. They had no children.

Notes

References

Attribution

1820 deaths
Year of birth unknown